"Over All Over Again" is a song recorded by Canadian country group James Barker Band. The song was co-written by the band's frontman James Barker, along with Gavin Slate, Travis Wood, and producer Todd Clark. It was their first single released after signing with Sony Music Nashville and Villa 40 in the United States.

Background 
The band's frontman James Barker wrote "Over All Over Again" with his co-writers during a two-day locked-down writing session in Nashville, Tennessee during the COVID-19 pandemic. He said it "felt like the right song at the right time" to be their first single on a U.S. label with Sony Music Nashville and Villa 40. Barker noted inspiration from Ronnie Milsap's "Smoky Mountain Rain", viewing at as a "refreshed" version of the band's music and their introduction to Nashville. He said there is a "kind of blueness to it from the darkness of the chords and melody, but the tempo keeps it clear of any gloomy territory".

Critical reception
Caleigh DeCaprio of NY Country Swag stated that while the song speaks to a "relatively more serious situation" than the band's previous music, it contains the "effortlessly flawless vocals" and "unique sound and style" from the band. Katrina Milich of Complete Country called the track the "perfect song to blast while driving with the windows down", saying it is "fun and upbeat but so relatable". Madeline Crone of American Songwriter said the song "exhibits the band's growth while honing their craft in Nashville". Top Country named "Over All Over Again" their "Pick of the Week" for August 8, 2021, noting a "bluesy undertone".

Accolades

Commercial performance
"Over All Over Again" reached a peak of number one on Billboard Canada Country chart for the week of September 25, 2021, becoming the band's third chart-topper in their home country. It also peaked at number 68 on the Canadian Hot 100 for the week of August 21, 2021, marking their highest charting entry there, later surpassed by the song's follow-up single "New Old Trucks" in 2022.

Credits and personnel
Credits adapted from AllMusic.

 Taylor Abram – backing vocals
 James Barker – lead vocals, guitar, songwriting
 Todd Clark — backing vocals, production, guitar, keyboard, programming, songwriting
 Dave Cohen – keyboard
 Jay Dufour – mixing
 Tony Lucido – bass guitar
 Darren McGill – mixing
 Andrew Mendelson – master engineering
 Justin Ostrander – guitar
 Jerry Roe – drums
 Gavin Slate – programming, songwriting
 Byron Sutton – acoustic guitar, mandolin
 Derek Wells – electric guitar
 Travis Wood – songwriting

Charts

References

2021 songs
2021 singles
James Barker Band songs
Songs written by James Barker (singer)
Songs written by Todd Clark
Songs written by Gavin Slate
Songs written by Travis Wood (songwriter)
Song recordings produced by Todd Clark